Whale music is a term for whale sound. It may also refer to:
Whale Music, a 1989 novel by Paul Quarrington
Whale Music (film), a 1994 Canadian film based on the Quarrington novel
Music from the Motion Picture Whale Music, the film's 1994 soundtrack by Rheostatics
Whale Music (album), an unrelated 1992 album by Rheostatics
Whale Music, 2008 album by David Rothenberg